IHH may refer to:

IHH Healthcare
 IHH (protein), a protein which in humans is encoded by the IHH gene
 IHH (Turkish NGO), an Islamic Turkish NGO active in more than 100 countries
 I Heart Huckabees, a 2004 philosophical comedy film
 Internationale Humanitäre Hilfsorganisation e.V., an international aid association based in Frankfurt
 Isolated hypogonadotropic hypogonadism